A list of poems by Robert E. Howard (1906–1936), an American writer and poet in early 20th century Texas. His love of poetry came from being read to by his mother at a young age. However, his attempts to make a living by poetry were unsuccessful and he is today most remembered for his short stories and fiction. Nevertheless, Howard wrote hundreds of poems; many were published within his lifetime and the others published after his 1936 suicide.

Key

The lack of information in a column does not necessarily mean that the information does not exist, only that verifiable information is not currently available. For example, the lack of publication information does not necessarily mean that a poem has not been published to date, nor does the lack of a definite note about the public domain indicate that a poem is still under copyright.

This table may be sorted by different columns by clicking on the icon in the appropriate column.  Clicking the icon again will alternate between ascending and descending order.

Additional notes

Title/Alternative title: Some poems are known by multiple titles.  Alternative titles are shown in the column of the same name. Every effort has been made to list full information at all entries for each title, to save the user time in scrolling. Occasionally, alternative titles appear consecutively, in which case the second entry will follow without additional information, shown in a darker gray on the table.  In other cases, some poems were not titled by Howard or the original title has not survived. Some poems have been given tentative titles after Howard's death; this is indicated in the Notes column. Where multiple titles exist, they have been listed alphabetically by their various designations following the word "Untitled."  Some pieces of poetry were used by Howard as epigraphs within his stories.  listed these poems under the title of the short story rather than the title of the poem itself, so the poems are listed under those titles as well.  With epigraphs, the first publication information given in this table is that of the poem's first printing separated from the story.

Lines: The number of lines in the poem.

Source text: Links given in the Source Text column are to copies of the poem in online libraries (where available). For ease of browsing the table, these links are preceded by a small icon. For example,  for poems on Wikisource.

References: Bibliographic references are given in the final column of each row.  The exception to this is the Notes column; as notes may come from diverse sources, or from a separate part of one of the main sources, each individual note is followed by its own reference.

Poetry

Notes
Further explanations
  These publications/dates indicate where and when these headings were first published independently of the works to which they were originally attached. 
  These tentative titles were used by Glenn Lord as a means to identify the poems where no original title was available. 
  An early work is defined as one believed to have been written before 1924. 

Notes on publications
  The Tattler was the newspaper of Brownwood High School. 
  The Cross Plains Review is the weekly newspaper for Cross Plains, Texas. 
  The Yellow Jacket is the newspaper of Howard Payne College. 
  The Daniel Baker Collegian was the newspaper of Daniel baker College of Brownwood; the college has since merged with Howard Payne College. 
  The Junto was a literary travelogue circulated from member to member on a mailing list from 1928 to 1930. 
  The Golden Caliph (1922 or 1923, one issue) and The Right Hook (1925, three issues) were amateur magazines created by Robert E. Howard and Tevis Clyde Smith as teenagers. 
  The Progress was published by Cross Plains High School.

Notes on short hand
  All or part of these poems are from or were included in a letter from Robert E. Howard to some recipient (the date is either the explicit date on the letter, an approximate dating of the letter where possible or else simply marked undated).  e.g. "Letter: Tevis Clyde Smith, June 23, 1926" indicates that the poem is from a letter to Tevis Clyde Smith dated June 23, 1926.
  These poems are in the public domain in the United States and any country where the Rule of the Shorter Term applies. 
  With these poems, two or more sources give different publications and dates of the first appearance. e.g. "Conflict: , The Howard Collector, 1962/, The Junto, 1929" indicates that  states first publication as The Howard Collector (published in 1962), while  states first publication as The Junto (published in 1929).  Always listed with the earliest date first.
  Howard sometimes used the same title more than once, or the same title has been attached to untitled works by others.  In these cases the poems have been numbered to distinguish them.  e.g. "(2)" following the title indicates that this the second poem with the same name.
  These poems were published under a pen name.  e.g. "Pen name: Patrick Howard" indicated that the poem was published under the pen name Patrick Howard.
  These poems were first published in a non-American publication. e.g. "French" indicates that it was first published in a French book or magazine.
   These poems are attributed to "Justin Geoffrey," a fictional poet Howard created for his fiction.
  These poems were originally used as epigraphs, heading chapter and whole stories, in works of prose fiction.  This list shows where they were printed separately from the prose.  e.g. "Epigraph: The Phoenix on the Sword" indicates that the poem was used as an opening in the short story The Phoenix on the Sword.
  These poems were part of a different work, usually prose fiction, but were not used to open the work or head chapters.  This list shows where they were printed separately from the main work, if at all. e.g. "From: Men of the Shadows" indicates that this poem was originally included in, or part of, the short storyMen of the Shadows.
  Poems with these titles are on record but no known copy exists today.
   Howard had an amazing ability to memorize poetry on one or two readings, and songs from a single hearing, and would often cite it from memory—with the inevitable discrepancies.  The departures from the original wording carry enough flavor of the Howard style to be of note here.  Most of these came from letters to Robert W. Gordon, editor of the ‘’Adventure’’ magazine column “Old Songs That Men Have Sung” from 1923–1927, and later the first head of the Archive of American Folk Song at the Library of Congress.

See also

 List of works by Robert E. Howard

References

Bibliographies

Other sources

External links

 
Bibliographies by writer
Poetry bibliographies
Bibliographies of American writers